Diablo or El Diablo may refer to:

Arts and entertainment

Fictional entities 
 Diablo (Disney), a raven in Sleeping Beauty
 Diablo (Marvel Comics), a Fantastic Four villain
 El Diablo (comics), several fictional characters from DC Comics
 Diablo, a character in the Diablo video game series
 a playable character in the video game Heroes of the Storm
 a character in the video game Primal Rage
 El Diablo, a superhero in the video game Freedom Force
 El Diablo, a character in The SpongeBob Movie: Sponge on the Run

Film and television
 El Diablo (1990 film), an American Western comedy 
 Diablo (2011 film), an Argentinian drama
 Diablo (2015 film), Canadian-American revisionist Western psychological thriller
 "El Diablo" (The Killing), a 2011 episode of the TV series

Gaming 
 Diablo (series), a video game series
 Diablo (video game), the first game of the series
 Diablo: Hellfire, a 1997 expansion
 Diablo II, the second game of the series
 Diablo II: Lord of Destruction, a 2001 expansion
 Diablo II: Resurrected, a 2021 remaster
 Diablo III, the third game of the series
 Diablo III: Reaper of Souls, a 2014 expansion
 Diablo IV, the fourth game of the series
 Diablo Immortal, the new mobile game set between Diablo 2 and Diablo 3.

Music 
 Diablo (band), a Finnish metal band

Albums
 El Diablo (album), by Italian rock band Litfiba
 Diablo II Soundtrack, the soundtrack of video game music from Diablo II.

Songs
 "Diablo", a 2001 song by Alejandra Guzmán from Soy
 "Diablo", a 2018 song by Simon Curtis
 "Diablo", a 2019 song by Ilira & Juan Magán
 "Diablo", a 2022 song by Rosalía from Motomami
 "El Diablo", a 1959 song by Frankie Laine
 "El Diablo", a 1976 song by ZZ Top from Tejas
 "El Diablo", a 1980 song by Grace Slick from Dreams
 "El Diablo", a 1985 song by Arcadia from So Red the Rose
 "El Diablo" (Machine Gun Kelly song), 2019
 "El Diablo" (Elena Tsagrinou song), 2021
 "Mt. Diablo", a 2010 song by The Story So Far from The Story So Far/Maker split and Under Soil and Dirt

People 
 El Diablo (nickname), a list of people known by the nickname
 Diablo Cody (born 1978), pen name of American screenwriter, producer and director Brook Busey-Maurio
 Diablo Velasco (1919–1999), ring name of Mexican professional wrestler and trainer Cuahutémoc Velasco Vargas
 Don Diablo (born 1980), Dutch DJ and producer
 Tommy Diablo, ring name of Armando Gorbea, Puerto Rican professional wrestler
 Danny Diablo (born 1971), a.k.a. Lord Ezec, recording artist, record producer, graffiti painter, actor and model

Places 
 Diablo, Panama

United States
 Diablo, California, a census-designated place
 Diablo, Washington, an unincorporated community
 Diablo Dam, in Diablo Canyon, Washington
 Diablo Lake
 Diablo Range, a mountain range in California
 Diablo Valley, California
 Mount Diablo, California
 Canyon Diablo (disambiguation)
 Diablo Canyon (disambiguation)
 Diablo Mountains (disambiguation)

Sports 
 Atlantic City Diablos, an American men's soccer team 2007–2008
 Atlantic City Diablos (WPSL)
 Diablos Motorcycle Club, an American outlaw motorcycle club
 Diablos Motorcycle Club (founded 1999), in Thailand 
 El Paso Diablos, two American baseball teams
 San Francisco Bay Diablos, an American soccer team 1993–1995
 Wichita Falls Diablos, an American indoor football team in 2008
 Mission Viejo High School, known as Diablos

Other uses 
 Diablo homolog (DIABLO), a mitochondrial protein
 Diablo sandwich, originating from Smokey and the Bandit
 Diablo Data Systems, a division of Xerox
 Diablo 630, a daisy wheel printer
 Diablo wind, a type of hot, dry wind
 , an American submarine, later PNS Ghazi
 Lamborghini Diablo, a sports car

See also 
 
 Diabolo (disambiguation)
 Diabolos (disambiguation)
 Casa Diablo (disambiguation)